Dennis Walter Tindall  is a former New Zealand soccer player who represented his country.

Tindall attended Nelson College in 1963. He made his full All Whites debut in a 2–4 loss to New Caledonia on 18 July 1971 and ended his international playing career with 21 A-international caps and 5 goals to his credit, his final cap also earned in a loss to New Caledonia, 1–2 on 2 October 1976.

References

External links

Living people
Year of birth missing (living people)
People educated at Nelson College
New Zealand association footballers
New Zealand international footballers
Association football midfielders
1973 Oceania Cup players